Cymbidiinae is an orchid subtribe in the tribe Cymbidieae.  The subtribe is named after the genus Cymbidium, the boat orchids.  It also contains the largest known species of orchids, Grammatophyllum speciosum.

See also
 Taxonomy of the Orchidaceae

References

External links

 
Orchid subtribes